Bernardo Oliveira may refer to:
 Bernardo Oliveira (archer)
 Bernardo Oliveira (soccer)